Gymnochiromyia flavella is a species of fly in the family Chyromyidae. It is found in the Palearctic.

References

External links
Images representing Gymnochiromyia at BOLD

Chyromyidae
Insects described in 1848
Muscomorph flies of Europe